Unmatched is a tabletop game published by Restoration Games and formally Mondo Tees in which two to four players use a combination of miniatures and cards to compete in a skirmish-style battle. Playable characters are drawn from mythology and pop-culture, with fighters ranging from Robin Hood to Bigfoot, Buffy the Vampire Slayer, Sherlock Holmes, and others. The game was originally released in 2019.

Development 
Unmatched was developed as a collaboration between Restoration Games, known for updating and redesigning old and out of print board games, and Mondo Tees, known for movie posters, t-shirts, and other collectibles. The game is based on the out of print games Star Wars Epic Duels, from Milton Bradley, and Tannhäuser, from Fantasy Flight Games. Each character features a miniature along with a unique deck of original art for that character. The game was initially available for sale at Gen Con in August 2019, where the entire early run sold out. The first three Unmatched sets were released to retail stores in September 2019.

Gameplay 
Before the game starts, players each choose a fighter and select a battle map for the match. Players are free to mix fighters and maps from different sets. During a game of unmatched, players take turns using a combination of cards and actions to move their fighters around the map, attack opponents and perform other actions. Players win by reducing every opposing fighter to zero health. The game can be played one-on-one, two-on-two, or as a free-for-all. Most fighters also have one or more sidekicks, represented by plastic tokens, which are able to move around the board, attack, and defend. Each map is divided up into color-coded zones, which are used to determine whether a ranged attacker has line of sight to an enemy, and also when resolving some card effects. Combat is resolved by declaring an attack against a fighter that is either adjacent to your character, or within line of sight for ranged attackers. The attacker chooses an attack card and plays it face down. If the defender player chooses to defend, and has a defense card available, they may play it facedown. Attack and defense cards are then revealed. If the attack value is higher than the defense value, the target of the attack takes the difference in damage. If no damage is dealt by the attack, the defender if considered the winner of that combat. Attack and defense cards may have additional ability that resolve as soon as their revealed, before damage is assigned, or after damage is assigned.

Adventures 
In March 2023, They announced the first adventure set "Tales to Amaze", that will feature two villains (Mothman and Martian Invader) for a cooperative play adventure which will allow for a whole new way to play the game.

Components 
Unmatched is played using a deck of cards unique to each character, plastic miniatures representing fighters, plastic tokens used to represent sidekicks, dials to track character health, and battle maps. Every set with two or more characters includes at least one battle map. Characters and maps from different sets can be mixed and matched.

Sets

Four character sets 

 Battle of Legends: Volume 1 - Includes Medusa, Sinbad, Alice, and King Arthur as playable characters, as well as two battle maps. 
 Battle of Legends: Volume 2 - Includes Sun Wukong, Yennenga, Bloody Mary, and Achilles as playable characters, and one battle map.
 Buffy the Vampire Slayer - Includes Buffy, Willow, Angel, and Spike as playable characters, as well as two battle maps.
 Cobble & Fog - Includes Sherlock Holmes, Jekyll & Hyde, The Invisible Man, and Dracula as playable characters, as well as two battle maps. 
Tales to Amaze - Includes Annie Christmas, Jill Trent, The Golden Bat and Nikola Tesla as playable characters, with Mothman and Martian Invader as villains, as well as two battle maps

Three character sets 

 Marvel's Redemption Row - Includes Luke Cage, Moon Knight, and Ghost Rider as playable characters, and one battle map.
 Marvel's Hells Kitchen - Includes Daredevil, Elektra, and Bullseye as playable characters, and one battle map.
 Marvel's Teen Spirit - Includes Squirrel Girl, Ms. Marvel, and Cloak and Dagger as playable characters, and one battle map.
 Marvel's For King and Country - Includes Black Widow, Black Panther, and Winter Soldier as playable characters, and one battle map.

Two character sets 

 Robin Hood vs. Bigfoot - Includes two battle maps.
 Jurassic Park: Ingen vs. Raptors - Includes Robert Muldoon, and three Velociraptors as playable characters, and one battle map.
 Jurassic Park: Dr. Ellie Sattler vs. T.Rex - Includes Dr. Sattler, and the T.Rex as playable characters, and one battle map.
 Little Red Riding Hood vs. Beowulf - Includes one battle map.
 Houdini vs. The Genie- Includes one battle map.

Single character sets 

 Bruce Lee - character only expansion.
 Deadpool - character only expansion.

Reception 
Unmatched has received praise for its easy to learn rules, and graphic design. Charlie Hall wrote for Polygon that "what makes the game truly stand apart is the quality and cohesiveness of its art and design." Matthew Smail of Big Boss Battle described Unmatched as "a superbly made game both in terms of its production and more importantly, it's mechanics." IGN's Matt Thrower wrote that "Every set in the Unmatched series is a masterclass in the art of doing a great deal with very little." and also noted that matches can begin to feel repetitive after several games.

References

External links 
Official website

Board games
Miniatures games
Dedicated deck card games